Constitutional Assembly elections were held in Latvia on 17 and 18 April 1920. The Latvian Social Democratic Workers' Party emerged as the largest party in the Constitutional Assembly, winning 57 of the 150 seats. The elections were boycotted by communist parties. The Constitutional Assembly was responsible for drafting a constitution, which was approved on 15 February and promulgated on 7 November 1922.

Results

References

Latvia
Constitutional Assembly
Parliamentary elections in Latvia
Independence of Latvia